Bishop Teodor Martynyuk (born 1 February 1974 in Yaremche, Ivano-Frankivsk Oblast, Ukrainian SSR) is a Ukrainian Greek Catholic hierarch as Auxiliary bishop of Ternopil – Zboriv since 22 May 2015.

Life
Bishop Teodor (his given name was Taras; Teodor is his monastic name), after graduation of the Pedagogical College in Kremenets, joined the Studite Brethren on April 7, 1993; he had monastic vows in the Univ Lavra on August 28, 1997, and was ordained as hieromonk on January 20, 2000, after graduation of Catholic University of Lublin in Poland.

He was superior of St. Michael monastery in Lviv (2003–2005) and then continued his studies in the Pontifical Oriental Institute in Rome with Doctor of Canon Law degree. During 2010–2015 he served as Hegumen of Univ Holy Dormition Lavra of the Studite Rite. Also since 2011 he has been professor of the Faculty of Eastern Canon Law at the Pontifical Oriental Institute.

On March 12, 2015, he was confirmed by the Pope as Auxiliary Bishop of Ternopil – Zboriv, Ukraine and Titular Bishop of Mopta. On May 22, 2015, he was consecrated as bishop by Major Archbishop Sviatoslav Shevchuk and other hierarchs of the Ukrainian Greek Catholic Church.

References

See also

1974 births
Living people
People from Yaremche
John Paul II Catholic University of Lublin alumni
Pontifical Oriental Institute alumni
Academic staff of the Pontifical Oriental Institute
Canonical theologians
Ukrainian Eastern Catholics
Studite Brethren
Bishops of the Ukrainian Greek Catholic Church